The 2023 Copa do Nordeste is the 20th edition of the main football tournament featuring teams from the Brazilian Northeast Region. The competition features 16 clubs, with Bahia, Ceará and Pernambuco having two seeds each, and Alagoas, Maranhão, Paraíba, Piauí, Rio Grande do Norte and Sergipe with one seed each. Four teams were decided by a qualifying tournament (Eliminatórias Copa do Nordeste 2023). The Copa do Nordeste began on 21 January and will end on 3 May 2023.

Fortaleza are the defending champions.

Format
In this season, 12 teams (9 state league champions and best placed teams in the 2022 CBF ranking from Ceará, Bahia and Pernambuco) gained direct entries into the group stage while the other four berths were decided by the Eliminatórias Copa do Nordeste.

For the group stage, the 16 teams were drawn into two groups. Each team will play once against the eight clubs from the other group. Top four teams will qualify for the final stages. Quarter-finals and semi-finals will be played on a single-leg basis and finals will be played on a home-and-away two-legged basis.

Qualification

The 2023 Copa do Nordeste qualification (officially the Eliminatórias Copa do Nordeste 2023) was the qualifying tournament of the 2023 Copa do Nordeste. It was played from 5 to 8 January 2023. Sixteen teams competed to decide four places in the Copa do Nordeste. The teams entered in two rounds where the four winners advanced to the Copa do Nordeste.

The winners were CSA (Alagoas), Ferroviário (Ceará), Santa Cruz (Pernambuco) and Vitória (Bahia).

Teams
The qualified teams are

Schedule
The schedule of the competition is as follows.

Draw
The draw for the group stage was held on 21 November 2022, 15:30, at the CBF headquarters in Rio de Janeiro. The teams (excluding the four teams from the qualification tournament) were seeded into three pots based on the 2022 CBF ranking (shown in parentheses). They were drawn into two groups of eight containing two teams from each of the three pots with the restriction that teams from the same federation could not be drawn into the same group.

The four teams from the qualification tournament will be drawn according to the position of their federation in the CBF state ranking with the restriction that teams from the same federation can not be drawn into the same group. If there are three or more qualified teams from the same federation, the two best teams in the CBF ranking will be allocated in different groups.

Group stage
For the group stage, the 16 teams were drawn into two groups of eight teams each. Each team will play on a single round-robin tournament against the eight clubs from the other group. The top four teams of each group will advance to the quarter-finals of the knockout stages. The teams will be ranked according to points (3 points for a win, 1 point for a draw, and 0 points for a loss). If tied on points, the following criteria will be used to determine the ranking: 1. Wins; 2. Goal difference; 3. Goals scored; 4. Fewest red cards; 5. Fewest yellow cards; 6. Draw in the headquarters of the Brazilian Football Confederation (Regulations Article 13).

Group A

Group B

Results

Final stages
Starting from the quarter-finals, the teams will play a single-elimination tournament with the following rules:
Quarter-finals and semi-finals will be played on a single-leg basis, with the higher-seeded team hosting the leg.
 If tied, the penalty shoot-out will be used to determine the winners (Regulations Article 17).
Finals will be played on a home-and-away two-legged basis, with the higher-seeded team hosting the second leg.
 If tied on aggregate, the penalty shoot-out will be used to determine the winners (Regulations Article 17).
Extra time will not be played and away goals rule will not be used in final stages.

Starting from the semi-finals, the teams will be seeded according to their performance in the tournament. The teams will be ranked according to overall points. If tied on overall points, the following criteria will be used to determine the ranking: 1. Overall wins; 2. Overall goal difference; 3. Overall goals scored; 4. Fewest red cards in the tournament; 5. Fewest yellow cards in the tournament; 6. Draw in the headquarters of the Brazilian Football Confederation (Regulations Article 18).

Bracket

Quarter-finals

|}

Group C

Group D

Group E

Group F

Semi-finals

|}

Group G

Group H

Finals

|}

Group I

References

2023 domestic association football cups
Copa do Nordeste
2023 in Brazilian football